Donatas Dundzys (born 4 December 1991) is a Lithuanian Paralympic athlete who competes in discus throw and shot put at international elite track and field competitions. He is a World bronze medalist and three-time European bronze medalist in shot put and a European silver medalist in the discus throw. He competed at the 2020 Summer Paralympics where he competed in the discus throw and shot put and finished seventh and sixth place respectively.

References

1991 births
Living people
Sportspeople from Alytus
Paralympic athletes of Lithuania
Lithuanian male discus throwers
Lithuanian male shot putters
Athletes (track and field) at the 2020 Summer Paralympics
Medalists at the World Para Athletics Championships
Medalists at the World Para Athletics European Championships